The 1925 Vanderbilt Commodores football team was an American football team that represented Vanderbilt University as a member of the Southern Conference during the 1925 football season. In its 21st year under head coach Dan McGugin, the team compiled a 6–3 record (3–3 against conference opponents), finished in 11th place in the conference, and outscored opponents by a total of 158 to 63.

Schedule

References

External links 

 

Vanderbilt
Vanderbilt Commodores football seasons
Vanderbilt Commodores football